Andriy Oleksandrovych Solovyov (born 23 August 2002) is a Ukrainian professional footballer who plays as a central midfielder for Ukrainian Premier League club Dinaz Vyshhorod, on loan from Kolos Kovalivka.

Career
In February 2023 he moved on loan to Dinaz Vyshhorod.

References

External links
 
 

2002 births
Living people
Footballers from Kyiv
Ukrainian footballers
Association football midfielders
FC Kolos Kovalivka players
SC Chaika Petropavlivska Borshchahivka players
Ukrainian Second League players